The XO Project is an international team of amateur and professional astronomers tasked with identifying extrasolar planets. They are led by Peter R. McCullough of the Space Telescope Science Institute. It is primarily funded by NASA's Origins Program and the Director's Discretionary Fund of the Space Telescope Science Institute.

Duties

Preliminary identification of possible star candidates starts at the Haleakala telescope in Hawaii by a team of professional astronomers. Once they identify a star that dims slightly from time to time, the information is forwarded to a team of amateur astronomers who then investigate for additional evidence suggesting this dimming is caused by a transiting planet. Once enough data is collected, it is forwarded to the University of Texas McDonald Observatory to confirm the presence of a transiting planet by a second team of professional astronomers.

Equipment
McCullough and his team employed a relatively inexpensive telescope called an XO Telescope, made from commercial equipment, to search for extrasolar planets. This telescope consists of two 200-millimeter telephoto camera lenses, and resembles binoculars in shape. It stands on the summit of the Haleakalā volcano in Hawaii.  Their first discovery of a Jupiter-sized planet orbiting a Sun-like star 600 light-years from Earth in the constellation Corona Borealis—XO-1b—was reported May 16, 2006 on Newswise.

In 2016 three similar double telescopes were operating, two in Spain and one in Utah.

Discoveries
XO-1b
XO-2b
XO-3b
XO-4b
XO-5b
XO-6b

References

External links 
 The XO Project website

Astronomy projects